Moaning Lisa are an Australian rock band formed in Canberra in 2016. The group has released two EPs, The Sweetest in 2017, and Do You Know Enough? in 2018.

The four members of Moaning Lisa studied music in Canberra. They are singer-bassist Charlie Versegi, singer-guitarist Hayley Manwaring, lead guitarist Ellen Chan, and drummer Hayden Fritzlaff. Their music has been described as punk rock, grunge rock, and shoegaze. In 2016, they won the National Campus Band Competition, and garnered media coverage for speaking out against anti-social behaviour at gigs. 

In January 2018, their single "Carrie (I Want a Girl)", referencing Carrie Brownstein, was lauded as an anthem for the LGBT community. That same year, Moaning Lisa won the National Live Music Award for ACT Live Act of the Year.

On tour, Moaning Lisa have supported the likes of Mitski, DZ Deathrays, Waax, Camp Cope, and Polish Club. They have also performed at Spilt Milk and Yours and Owls, with upcoming performances at Splendour in the Grass and Stonefest.

In 2021, the band signed with Farmer & the Owl and released "Something" in March 2021 and "Inadequacy" in June 2021. The band's debut album Something Like This But Not This was released on 8 October 2021.

Discography

Studio albums

Extended plays

Singles

Awards and nominations

National Live Music Awards
The National Live Music Awards (NLMAs) are a broad recognition of Australia's diverse live industry, celebrating the success of the Australian live scene. The awards commenced in 2016.

|-
| National Live Music Awards of 2018
| Moaning Lisa
| ACT Live Act of the Year
| 
|-
| National Live Music Awards of 2019
| Hayley Manwaring (Moaning Lisa)
| Live Bassist of the Year
| 
|-

National Campus Band Competition
The National Campus Band Competition is an Australia-wide live music competition specifically for tertiary students. Bands participate in heats to win the chance to represent their state in the finals. After winning their heat in the ACT, Moaning Lisa attended the final performance at Melbourne venue Nothcote Social Club, winning three days of studio time where they would record their first EP, and cash prize. Previous notable winners include Jebediah and Eskimo Joe.

References

2016 establishments in Australia
Australian Capital Territory musical groups
Australian indie rock groups
Musical groups established in 2016
Father/Daughter Records artists